Damien Mahavony (born December 15, 1985) is a Malagasy footballer currently plays for Curepipe Starlight SC.

External links
 

1985 births
Living people
Malagasy footballers
Madagascar international footballers
AS Adema players
Association football midfielders
USCA Foot players